Battalion of Death can refer to a number of military units in various countries:
In Poland
 Poznań Volunteer Death's Battalion, active within the ranks of 1st Legions Infantry Division during the Polish–Bolshevik War
 II/36th Infantry Regiment, which earned its nickname during the Polish–Ukrainian War of 1919
 Battalion of Death for Freedom, a resistance organisation formed in Toruń in 1939, during World War II
 In Russia
The Women's Battalion of Death was a small corps drawn from 2,000 female volunteers, formed between the February Revolution and the October Revolution in Russia in 1917, commanded by Maria Botchkareva, and loyal to the Provisional Government
Chechen Death Battalion, commanded by Apti Bolotkhanov, which fought in the Russo-Ukrainian War
Other meanings of the term include:
The International Battalion of Death is the name taken by the person or group behind a website claiming responsibility for suicide attacks in Bali and elsewhere in the aftermath of September 11
The Detroit Tigers' infield from 1933 to 1935 consisting of Hank Greenberg at first base, Charlie Gehringer at second base, Billy Rogell at shortstop, and Marv Owen at third base.
 Other American sporting outfits have at various times been called Battalion of Death, possibly drawing inspiration from a Black Battalion of Death formed by African-American Buffalo Soldiers of World War I.
Certain Republican senators formed a hard core that opposed President Woodrow Wilson's proposed League of Nations. They were known as "irreconcilables" or 'the Battalion of Death."
"Death Battalion", a song on the 2016 album Good Morning Apocalypse by Heaven Below